State Route 2B was one of Nevada’s original state highways, first appearing on official state highway maps around 1929. It ran east along present-day Fort Churchill Road and then turned south along present-day Alternate US 95 to Yerington.

The section of SR 2B south of Fort Churchill Road was replaced by Alternate US 95 in 1941. Fort Churchill Road remained on state maps as a state highway until 1981 but was never paved during that time.

References 

002B
U.S. Route 95